GS Ilioupolis is a multi-sport club based in Ilioupoli, Athens, Greece.

The club was founded in 1953, and it has about 2,000 athletes competing in nine sports.
The fans of G.C.Ilioupolis is Rebels9..They are supported the team every where..The emblem of club is Sam Yoshimate and since 2003..They are very popular for choreography and fantastic atmosphere who makes in every game..This year they celebrate 20 YEARS OF BIRTH

Colours and crest
GS Ilioupoli's colours are red and blue and its logo features a setting sun on its nearby mountains and the ground.

Sports
Basketball (Men's and Women's)
Football
Judo
Tennis
Track and field
Swimming
Volleyball (Men's and Women's)
Water polo
Handball (defunct)
Futsal (defunct)

Football team
The football team of Ilioupolis achieved to play in Beta Ethniki (2nd tier championship) for two years, the seasons 2021-22

Honours
Gamma Ethniki
Winners (1): 2021–22

Players

Basketball team
Ilioupolis has basketball team both men's and women's. The basketball team of GS Ilioupolis plays in the Athens local divisions. Biggest success of the club was winning the Gamma Ethniki championship, in the season 1994-95

Volleyball team
The women’s volleyball team of GS Ilioupolis plays in the A1 Ethniki (1st-tier championship). It plays for 2nd consecutive season in A1 Ethniki and has played again in the past, from 1995 to 1999.

Water polo team
GS Ilioupolis water polo team plays in A1 Ethniki Water Polo. It won the ascension during the last season (2014–15) when it finished in the 2nd place in A2 Ethniki championship.

Track and field
Rankings:
2010: 63rd (out of 321 clubs)
2011: 49th (out of 299 clubs).
2012: 44th (out of 281 clubs)

Futsal team
Ilioupoli had a futsal team. This team had won a Greek cup in 2009. In the same year it was the finalist of the championship. The next years, Ilioupoli Futsal team finished in the 5th or 6th place of the championship until 2012 when the team withdrew from the championship.

Titles
Futsal team
Hellenic Futsal Cup
Winner (1) :2009

References

External links
 GS Ilioupolis - Official site

Football clubs in Attica
Association football clubs established in 1953
1953 establishments in Greece
Multi-sport clubs in Greece
Gamma Ethniki clubs